The Zamelis Synagogue is a former synagogue in Vilnius, Lithuania.

History 
The Synagogue was built at the beginning of the 19th century, between 1817 and 1833. It was actively used until 1940. After World War II it was used as a warehouse and apartment complex. At the end of the 20th century, the building was abandoned.

Current state 
In 2015 the reconstruction works in the abandoned synagogue started.

Currently the building is not used for religious activities, but hosts various cultural events.

See also
Lithuanian Jews

References

External links 
 2020 reconstruction gallery

Synagogues in Vilnius